FedACH is the Federal Reserve Banks' automated clearing house (ACH) service. In 2007, FedACH processed about 37 million transactions per day with an average aggregate value of about $58 billion. For comparison, Fedwire processed about 537,000 transactions valued at nearly $2.7 trillion per day in the same year.

FedACH is a batch processing-based system. In 2023, the Federal Reserve Banks are planning to launch the FedNow service, a real-time processing system for facilitating instant payments.

See also 
 Electronic Payments Network
 Fedwire
 National Automated Clearing House
 National Settlement Service
 Clearing House Interbank Payments System (CHIPS)
 Depository Trust & Clearing Corporation
 Society for Worldwide Interbank Financial Telecommunication

References

External links 
 

Payment clearing systems
Interbank networks
Federal Reserve System